Bogusze  is a village in the administrative district of Gmina Prostki, within Ełk County, Warmian-Masurian Voivodeship, in northern Poland.

The village has a population of 336.

The village was established in 1438.

During the German occupation of Poland during World War II there was a German-operated POW camp in Bogusze. Polish civilians were also imprisoned in the camp. Many Russian and Italian soldiers as well as Polish civilians died of hunger or cold or were murdered in the camp. In 1959 a monument dedicated to the victims of German crimes was unveiled at the site.

References

Bogusze
Łomża Governorate
Białystok Voivodeship (1919–1939)
Belastok Region